Ricardo Silva de Almeida, simply known as Ricardinho (born 2 June 1989) is a Brazilian football midfielder who currently plays for Persik Kediri in Indonesia.

Career
Born in São Paulo, he played in Brazil with Corinthians B. During the second part of season 2010/11, he was loaned to Serbian SuperLiga club FK Sloboda Užice where he had played for 3 matches. After that he returned to Brazil. At the beginning of 2013, he came back in Serbia to FK Borac Čačak.  By the end of 2013 he returned to Brazil ald joined Operário playing in the Campeonato Paranaense.

In summer 2014 he signed with Stade Tunisien.

In August 2015 he signed with Bolivian club Guabirá.

Ricardinho joined Episkopi in Greece in January 2019.

Honours
Real Estelí
Nicaraguan Primera División: 2015–16

References

External sources
 Personal website
 Ricardinho at Srbijafudbal
 
 Ricardinho at playmakerstats.com (English version of ogol.com.br)
 

1989 births
Living people
Footballers from São Paulo
Brazilian footballers
Brazilian expatriate footballers
Association football midfielders
FK Sloboda Užice players
Serbian SuperLiga players
FK Borac Čačak players
Expatriate footballers in Serbia
Marília Atlético Clube players
Roma Esporte Apucarana players
Sport Club Barueri players
Operário Ferroviário Esporte Clube players
Esporte Clube Tigres do Brasil players
Stade Tunisien players
Expatriate footballers in Tunisia
Real Estelí F.C. players
Expatriate footballers in Nicaragua
Guabirá players
Expatriate footballers in Bolivia